Almadin (also Romanized as Ālmādīn; also known as ‘Almdīn, Halmain, and Halman) is a village in Agahan Rural District, Kolyai District, Sonqor County, Kermanshah Province, Iran. At the 2006 census, its population was 89, in 16 families.

References 

Populated places in Sonqor County